Mamertinus may refer to:

 Marcus Petronius Sura Mamertinus, consul 182 AD
 Marcus Petronius Mamertinus, suffect consul 150 AD
 Claudius Mamertinus, consul 362 AD
 Mamertinus of Auxerre (d. ca. 462 AD), an abbot and saint
 Carcer Mamertinus, a jail at the foot of the Capitol in Rome, supposed to have been built by Ancus Marcius

See also